was a Japanese Marxist economist of the Taishō and early Shōwa periods.

Biography
Born in Yamaguchi, he graduated from Tokyo Imperial University.  After writing for Yomiuri Shimbun, he attained a professorship in economics at Kyoto Imperial University. Increasingly inclined toward Marxism, he participated in the March 15 incident of 1928 and was expelled from the university as a subversive. The following year, he joined the formation of a political party, Shinrōtō. Kawakami went on to publish a Marxist-oriented economics journal, Studies of Social Problems. After joining the outlawed Japanese Communist Party, he was arrested in 1933 and sent to prison. After his release in 1937, he translated Das Kapital from German to Japanese.  Kawakami spent the remainder of his life writing essays; novels; poetry; and his autobiography,Jijoden, which was written secretly between 1943 and 1945 and serialized in 1946. It became a best-seller and was "extravagantly praised as being unprecedented in Japanese letters."

References

External links
 Takutoshi Inoue and Kiichiro Yagi, "Two Inquirers on the Divide: Tokuzo Fukuda and Hajime Kawakami" (Faculty of Economics, Kyoto University)

1879 births
1946 deaths
Japanese activists
Japanese communists
Japanese economists
Japanese Marxists
19th-century Japanese novelists
20th-century Japanese novelists
Academic staff of Kyoto University
Marxian economists
Marxist writers
People from Yamaguchi Prefecture
University of Tokyo alumni